Francisco de Lersundi y Hormaechea (28 January 1817 in Valencia, Spain – 17 November 1874 in Bayonne, France) was a Spanish noble and politician who served as Prime Minister of Spain in 1853 and held other important offices such as Captain General of Cuba from 1866 to 1869.

Prime Ministers of Spain
Governors of Cuba
1817 births
1874 deaths
Moderate Party (Spain) politicians
19th-century Spanish politicians
People from Valencia
Military personnel of the First Carlist War